Piper's Hill is a hill north of Cheung Sha Wan in Kowloon of Hong Kong. Administratively, it is on the border between Sham Shui Po District and Sha Tin District.

Geography 
The hill is to the east of Butterfly Valley and to the west of Eagle's Nest. Tai Po Road goes through Lai Chi Kok Pass in over hill. With a height of 230 metres, the hill has a helipad at its peak, accessible via Piper's Hill Road.

See also 

 Geography of Hong Kong
 List of mountains, peaks and hills in Hong Kong
 Lion Rock

References 

Mountains, peaks and hills of Hong Kong
Cheung Sha Wan